The Tucson mayoral election of 1999 occurred on November 2, 1999 to elect the mayor of Tucson, and occurred coinciding with the elections to the Tucson City Council wards 1, 2 and 4. It saw the election of Bob Walkup.

Incumbent mayor George Miller did not seek reelection to a third term.

Nominations
Primaries were held for the Democratic, Libertarian, and Republican parties on September 7, 1999.

Democratic primary
Originally also running in the Democratic primary was Emily Machala, who formally withdrew, and Michael Fleishman, who was removed from the ballot by a court ruling.

Libertarian primary
Originally also running in the Libertarian primary was Elizabeth Strong-Anderson, who was removed from the ballot by court order.

Republican primary

Write-ins
Dave Croteau
Stephen "The Penneyman" Baker

General election
In the general election, McKasson suffered and Walkup benefited from a fracture in the Democratic Party.

Walkup became the city's first Republican mayor since Lew Murphy left office in 1987.

References

Mayoral elections in Tucson, Arizona
Tucson
Tucson